This article will list the confirmed men's squads lists for the 2022 Badminton Asia Team Championships. The ranking stated are based on the BWF World Ranking date on 8 February 2022 as per tournament's prospectus. Chinese Taipei and Thailand withdrew.

Group A

Indonesia
10 players are scheduled to represent Indonesia in the men's team competition of the 2022 Badminton Asia Team Championships.

India
10 players are scheduled to represent India in the men's team competition of the 2022 Badminton Asia Team Championships.

South Korea
10 players are scheduled to represent South Korea in the men's team competition of the 2022 Badminton Asia Team Championships.

Hong Kong
10 players are scheduled to represent Hong Kong in the men's team competition of the 2022 Badminton Asia Team Championships.

Group B

Japan
8 players are scheduled to represent Japan in the men's team competition of the 2022 Badminton Asia Team Championships.

Malaysia
12 players are scheduled to represent Malaysia in the men's team competition of the 2022 Badminton Asia Team Championships.

Singapore
10 players are scheduled to represent Singapore in the men's team competition of the 2022 Badminton Asia Team Championships.

Kazakhstan
6 players are scheduled to represent Kazakhstan in the men's team competition of the 2022 Badminton Asia Team Championships.

References

2022 Badminton Asia Team Championships